Richard Bush (fl. 1380s) was a member of the Parliament of England for the constituency of Maldon in Essex between 1381 and 1386.

He was still alive in 1398. He had a relative, perhaps his son, Richard Bush junior.

References 

14th-century births
Year of death unknown
Members of Parliament for Maldon
14th-century English people
People in retailing
Date of death unknown